The Endgame Tour was a concert tour by punk band Rise Against, taking place from 2011 to 2013, in support of their sixth full-length studio album Endgame.

The tour began on February 25, 2011, with the band's first visit to South America, playing a short leg with two dates in Brazil and one in Argentina with supporting act Berri Txarrak. This followed a short tour of small venues in Europe with supporting act Coliseum, and a major US tour with supporting acts Bad Religion and Four Year Strong.

In July, the band headlined a tour of Oceania with supporting acts Sick of It All and Break Even, which was followed by a run of European festival dates in August, including playing the Reading and Leeds Festivals.

The band was then chosen as the main guest supporting act on the Foo Fighters' fall headlining tour in support of Wasting Light, which took place in September, after which Rise Against headlined their own Canadian tour with supporting acts Flogging Molly and The Black Pacific. Between November 2–13, 2011, the band played their first UK headlining tour in 2 years, supported by Tom Morello: The Nightwatchman and Polar Bear Club, the band also played one date in Scotland during the tour, and added an additional date in Rome, Italy on November 15. In December, the band played a series of Christmas special radio festival shows.

The band's first tour of 2012 was another US headlining leg, which was supported by A Day to Remember and The Menzingers, with Glassjaw also joining as a special guest supporting act at the New York City show on February 3. Between February 28–March 20, 2012, the band headlined another tour of Europe, visiting countries they haven't visited in years like Norway, Finland and the Czech Republic, and also touring Germany. The tour was supported by Architects and Touché Amoré. The band followed with another leg of the US in April–May, which was supported by A Day to Remember and Title Fight.

Set list

Tour dates

Support acts

 A Day to Remember (January 17–February 5, 2012; April 15–May 10, 2012)
 AbraSKAdabra (February 25, 2011)
 Antillectual (August 13, 2011)
 Architects (February 28–March 10, 15–20, 2012)
 Authority Zero (September 27, 2012)
 Bad Religion (April 5–May 14, 2011)
 Berri Txarrak (February 25–27, 2011)
 Break Even (July 14–23, 2011)
 Coliseum (March 11–27, 2011)
 Descendents (April 7, 2011)
 Four Year Strong (April 5–May 14, 2011)
 Flogging Molly (September 30–October 12, 2011)
 Gallows (June 12–14, 2012; June 19, 2012)
 Glassjaw (February 3, 2012)
 Hot Water Music (September 11–13, 2012; September 16–25; 2012; September 28–October 7, 2012)
 Good Intentions (February 26, 2011)

 The Vandals (September 9, 2012)
 NOFX (September 21, 2012)
 Polar Bear Club (November 2–15, 2011)
 Port (812) (March 12, 2012)
 Sick of It All (July 14–23, 2011)
 Shameless Losers (February 27, 2011)
 T-34 (March 13, 2012)
 Templeton Pek (August 13–15, 23, 2011)
 The Black Pacific (September 27–October 12, 2011)
 The Bronx (September 14–26, 2011)
 The Gaslight Anthem (September 11–13, 2012; September 16–20, 2012; September 24–25, 2012; September 28–October 7, 2012)
 The Menzingers (January 17–February 5, 2012)
 The Vandals (September 9, 2012)
 Title Fight (April 15–May 10, 2012)
 Tom Morello: The Nightwatchman (November 2–13, 2011)
 Touché Amoré (February 28–March 10, 15–20, 2012)

As a support act
 Foo Fighters (September 14–26, 2011)

Personnel
Tim McIlrath – lead vocals, rhythm guitar
Zach Blair – lead guitar, backing vocals
Joe Principe – bass guitar, backing vocals
Brandon Barnes – drums, percussion

Songs played

From The Unraveling
Alive and Well
Six Ways 'Til Sunday
Remains of Summer Memories
Stained Glass and Marble
Everchanging

From Revolutions per Minute
Heaven Knows
Like the Angel
Blood-Red, White & Blue
Broken English
Torches

From Siren Song of the Counter Culture
State of the Union
Paper Wings
Blood to Bleed
Give It All
Swing Life Away

From The Sufferer & the Witness
Chamber the Cartridge
Injection
Ready to Fall
Prayer of the Refugee
Drones
Behind Closed Doors
The Good Left Undone
Survive

From Appeal to Reason
Collapse (Post-Amerika)
Long Forgotten Sons
Re-Education (Through Labor)
The Dirt Whispered
From Heads Unworthy
The Strength to Go On
Audience of One
Entertainment
Hero of War
Savior

From Endgame
Architects
Help Is on the Way
Make It Stop (September's Children)
Disparity By Design
Satellite
Midnight Hands
Survivor Guilt
Broken Mirrors
Wait for Me

References

2011 concert tours
2012 concert tours
Rise Against concert tours